Communauté d'agglomération du Caudrésis et du Catésis is the communauté d'agglomération, an intercommunal structure, centred on the towns of Caudry and Le Cateau-Cambrésis. It is located in the Nord department, in the Hauts-de-France region, northern France. Created in 2011, its seat is in Beauvois-en-Cambrésis. Its area is 372.7 km2. Its population was 64,124 in 2019, of which 14,121 in Caudry.

Composition
The communauté d'agglomération consists of the following 46 communes:

Avesnes-les-Aubert
Bazuel
Beaumont-en-Cambrésis
Beauvois-en-Cambrésis
Bertry
Béthencourt
Bévillers
Boussières-en-Cambrésis
Briastre
Busigny
Carnières
Le Cateau-Cambrésis
Catillon-sur-Sambre
Cattenières
Caudry
Caullery
Clary
Dehéries
Élincourt
Estourmel
Fontaine-au-Pire
La Groise
Haucourt-en-Cambrésis
Honnechy
Inchy
Ligny-en-Cambrésis
Malincourt
Maretz
Maurois
Mazinghien
Montay
Montigny-en-Cambrésis
Neuvilly
Ors
Pommereuil
Quiévy
Rejet-de-Beaulieu
Reumont
Saint-Aubert
Saint-Benin
Saint-Hilaire-lez-Cambrai
Saint-Souplet
Saint-Vaast-en-Cambrésis
Troisvilles
Villers-Outréaux
Walincourt-Selvigny

References

Caudresis Catesis
Caudresis Catesis